Grant Ashley Smith (born 20 November 1993) is an English professional footballer who plays as a goalkeeper for National League side Yeovil Town.

Career
Smith began his career playing in the youth system of Eldon Celtic before joining the academy of Reading in 2007, before moving to Fulham. After spending two years with Fulham, Smith joined the development squad at Brighton & Hove Albion in September 2012, agreeing a one-year contract extension in May 2013. He joined Bognor Regis Town in February 2014. In May 2014 he was released by Brighton & Hove Albion. He joined Hayes & Yeading United in September 2014, before moving to Farnborough a month later. However, after just three appearances, Smith returned to Hayes & Yeading United at the end of October

The 2015–16 season saw his second spell with Bognor Regis Town where he was an ever present in the club's successful season which included a run to the semi-final of the FA Trophy; Smith's efforts saw him named the Fans' Player of the Year but the distance in travelling from his Reading home saw him elect to leave the club at the end of the season and join Boreham Wood,

Smith signed for Lincoln City in June 2018. He made his professional debut on 14 August 2018, in the EFL Cup. He signed on loan for Maidstone United in October 2018, but was recalled on 4 December 2018. On 31 January 2020 he rejoined Boreham Wood on loan for the rest of the 2019/20 season. On 28 May 2020, it was announced Smith would leave the club at the end of his current contract.

On 24 October 2020, Smith joined Wealdstone. Less than a month later Smith was released as Wealdstone tried to balance the books during the COVID-19 pandemic.

In January 2021, Smith signed for fellow National League side Chesterfield. Originally only on a short-term contract, Smith signed a new contract extension in April 2021 that would keep him at the club until the summer of 2022. Smith left the club by mutual consent on 18 June 2021.

On 23 June 2021, Smith joined National League side Yeovil Town on a one-year deal. Smith has his contract extension triggered at the end of the 2021–22 season.

Career statistics

Honours
Lincoln City
EFL League Two: 2018–19

References

1993 births
Living people
English footballers
Reading F.C. players
Fulham F.C. players
Brighton & Hove Albion F.C. players
Farnborough F.C. players
Hayes & Yeading United F.C. players
Bognor Regis Town F.C. players
Boreham Wood F.C. players
Lincoln City F.C. players
Maidstone United F.C. players
Wealdstone F.C. players
Chesterfield F.C. players
Yeovil Town F.C. players
Association football goalkeepers
Isthmian League players
English Football League players
National League (English football) players